Ferguson Cheruiyot Rotich (born 30 November 1989) is a Kenyan middle-distance runner who competes in the 800 metres. He has a personal best of 1:42.54 minutes for the event. He represented Kenya at the 2013 World Championships in Athletics and was a gold medallist in the 4×800 metres relay at the 2014 IAAF World Relays. At the 2020 Summer Olympics, he won the silver medal, finishing behind his countryman Emmanuel Korir.

Career
A relative late-comer to the sport, he made his first impact in the 2013 season at the age of 23. He won the 800 m at the Meeting Grand Prix IAAF de Dakar, setting a personal best of 1:45.40 minutes. In his first race in Europe, he went under one minute and 45 seconds for the first time to take fourth at the Golden Spike Ostrava. He placed a narrow second to Anthony Chemut at the Kenyan trials in July, improving further to 1:44.38 minutes. This led to his selection for the 2013 World Championships in Athletics. At the competition, he progressed to the semi-final and initially placed fifth but was disqualified for a lane infringement. He ended the year with two performances on the 2013 IAAF Diamond League circuit, coming third at both the Weltklasse Zürich and the Memorial Van Damme. The latter race was the fastest in the year, and Rotich's time of 1:43.22 minutes ranked him as the third fastest in the world that season, making it a rapid rise for the athlete who was unranked in 2012.

At the first meet of the 2014 IAAF Diamond League in Doha, he came third. He was chosen for the 4×800 metres relay team (alongside Sammy Kibet Kirongo, Job Koech Kinyor and Alfred Kipketer) at the inaugural 2014 IAAF World Relays event and leading off for Kenya he helped the team to the gold medal.

At the 2015 Athletics Kenya World Championship Trials, Rotich shocked world record holder David Rudisha in the 800 metres, beating him by almost half a second to qualify for the 2015 World Championships in Athletics.

International competition record

References

External links

Living people
1989 births
Kenyan male middle-distance runners
Athletes (track and field) at the 2014 Commonwealth Games
World Athletics Championships athletes for Kenya
Athletes (track and field) at the 2016 Summer Olympics
Olympic athletes of Kenya
World Athletics Championships winners
People from Kericho County
Diamond League winners
Commonwealth Games competitors for Kenya
Athletes (track and field) at the 2020 Summer Olympics
Medalists at the 2020 Summer Olympics
Olympic silver medalists in athletics (track and field)
Olympic silver medalists for Kenya